Denise Lyttle (born 8 September 1967) is an Irish sailor. She competed in the 1992 Summer Olympics and 1996 Summer Olympics.

References

1967 births
Living people
Place of birth missing (living people)
Irish female sailors (sport)
Olympic sailors of Ireland
Sailors at the 1992 Summer Olympics – Europe
Sailors at the 1996 Summer Olympics – 470